The Orthodox Church of the Czech Lands and Slovakia is a self-governing body of the Eastern Orthodox Church that territorially covers the countries of the Czech Republic and Slovakia.

History

Foundation 
The Church of the Czech Lands and Slovakia presents both an ancient history as well as a very modern history. The present-day church occupies the land of Great Moravia, where the brothers Ss. Cyril and Methodius began their mission to the Slavs, introducing the liturgical and canonical order of the Eastern Orthodox Church, translated into Church Slavonic, using mostly Greek calques to explain concepts for which no Slavic term existed. In doing this they developed the first Slavic alphabet, a mixture of Greek and Hebrew-based characters with a few invented characters of their own to represent unique Slavic sounds.

This was done at the express invitation of the powerful ruler Rastislav of Moravia. Yet within the Moravian state there was a Frankish party among the nobility who desired closer ties with the Kingdom of Francia, whose ruler, Louis the German, was Ratislav's nominal suzerain, and a Frankish bishop had ecclesiastical jurisdiction over a small part of Ratislav's domain that had earlier converted to Christianity. Despite the Photian Schism, the churches of Rome and Constantinople still preserved some semblance of unity, and Pope Nicholas I did not want to see the formation of a large independent Frankish church in Central Europe. When an appeal of the ecclesiastical issue was made to Rome, Nicholas summoned both Cyril and Methodius and the complaining Frankish parties to his court to hear them out. Nicholas died before their arrival, but the new Pope Adrian II reached a compromise after hearing both sides: Old Church Slavonic was confirmed as a liturgical language alongside Greek, Hebrew and Latin, and Methodius was confirmed as bishop with a Frankish co-adjutor, Wiching. Adrian was convinced by Cyril's impassioned defence of the Slavic liturgy in which he cited 1 Corinthians 14:19 "Yet in the church I had rather speak five words with my understanding, that by my voice I might teach others also, than ten thousand words in an unknown tongue." Cyril fell ill while the brothers were still at Rome, and on his deathbed he asked Methodius to swear to return to Moravia and complete the mission to the Slavs instead of returning to the monastic life on Mount Olympus as he had intended to do.

Methodius kept his word and returned, but his mission was interrupted by the death of Ratislav, as the new ruler, Svatopluk I of Moravia sided with the pro-Frankish party and had Methodius imprisoned for almost three years, until he was freed through the intercession of Pope John VIII. For the next ten years, Methodius continued his work, but the death of John VIII in 882 removed his papal protection, and Methodius died in 885. After this, Pope Stephen V of Rome confirmed his Swabian co-adjutor Wiching as bishop. Methodius's disciples were imprisoned, expelled to Bulgaria, like Gorazd and many others, or enslaved. The expelled, led by Clement of Ohrid and Naum of Preslav, were of great importance to the Eastern Orthodox faith in the already Christian from year 864 Bulgaria, after they were released from prison and escorted to the Danube. In AD 870 the Fourth Council of Constantinople granted the Bulgarians the right to have the oldest organized autocephalous Slavic Orthodox Church that little later, from autonomous Bulgarian archbishopric, became patriarchate. Major event that strengthens the process of Christianization was the development of the Cyrillic script in Bulgaria at the founded by Naum and Clement Preslav Literary School in the 9th century. The Cyrillic script and the liturgy in Old Church Slavonic, were declared official in Bulgaria in 893.

Survival and revival 

The Eastern Orthodox ecclesiastical order survived in present-day eastern Slovakia and neighboring regions due to its nearness and influence to Kievan Rus', especially among the population of the Rusins, until the middle of the 17th century when the Union of Uzhgorod was brought about in the Kingdom of Hungary. During the times of suppression, remaining Eastern Orthodox Christians from the region kept their ties with neighboring Eastern Orthodox Eparchy of Buda of the Serbian Patriarchate of Peć and later with the Metropolitanate of Karlovci. One of the most northern parishes of the Serbian Orthodox Church existed in the Slovak city of Komárno with local church built in the 18th century still standing today.

After the creation of Czechoslovakia in 1918, legal restraints to Eastern Orthodoxy were removed. In the new state, Eastern Orthodox communities were mainly located in the eastern parts of the country, including Carpatho-Rus' that was incorporated into Czechoslovakia in 1919. In that region, the city of Mukachevo was located with its traditions going back to the old Eastern Orthodox Eparchy of Mukachevo, that existed before the Union of Uzhgorod. In the spirit of Eastern Orthodox revival, many people in the region left the Uniate (Greek Catholic) Church. Since there were no Eastern Orthodox bishops in Czechoslovakia, local leaders looked to the Serbian Orthodox Church because Serbs were historically and ethnically close to the Czechs, Slovaks and Rusins. That view was also supported by state authorities of Czechoslovakia (1920). In order to regulate the ecclesiastical order, Bishop Dositej Vasić of Niš (Serbia) arrived in Prague and met with leaders of Eastern Orthodox community, receiving them into full communion (1921).

Among those seeking to restore ties with Eastern Orthodox Church was a Catholic priest Matěj Pavlík, who had been interested in Eastern Orthodoxy for years. The Serbian Orthodox Church thus consented to receive him in full communion and he became Archimandrite with the name Gorazd, in honor of Saint Gorazd of Moravia, disciple and successor of Saint Methodius, Archbishop of Moravia. On September 25, 1921, Archimandrite Gorazd was consecrated Bishop of Moravia and Silesia at the Cathedral of the Holy Archangel Michael in Belgrade, Yugoslavia, by Serbian Patriarch Dimitrije. Bishop Gorazd received jurisdiction over Czech Lands.

As the Orthodox leader in the new nation of Czechoslovakia, Bishop Gorazd laid the foundations of the Orthodox Church throughout Bohemia, Moravia, and also into Slovakia. In Bohemia, he oversaw the building of eleven churches and two chapels. He also published the essential books for the conduct of church services that were translated into Czech. He provided aid to those in Slovakia and Carpatho-Rus', which then was part of Czechoslovakia, and who wanted to return to Eastern Orthodox Faith from the Unia, Union with Rome. Thus, in the inter-war period, Bishop Gorazd built the small Czech church that during World War II would show how firmly it was connected to the Czech nation.

By 1931, Eastern Orthodox renewal in eastern Slovakia and Carpatho-Rus' was progressing very well, allowing the creation of the second Diocese that was named: Eparchy of Mukačevo and Prešov. That diocese was also created under the auspices of the Serbian Orthodox Church. First bishop of Mukachevo and Prešov was Damaskin Grdanički. In 1938, he was succeeded by Bishop Vladimir Rajić.

In 1938, Nazi Germany succeeded in annexing the Sudetenland from Czechoslovakia during the Munich Conference. In the same year, after the First Vienna Award, southern parts of Slovakia and Carpathian Ruthenia were annexed by Fascist Hungary. Since the city of Mukačevo was taken by Fascist Hungary, bishop Vladimir had to move to the city of Khust. In 1939, Nazi Germany annexed the remainder of the Czech lands into the Protectorate of Bohemia and Moravia and installed a pro-Nazi regime in Slovakia. In the same time, Fascist Hungary occupied the rest of Carpathian Ruthenia and in 1941 Hungarian authorities arrested bishop Vladimir Rajić and deported him back to Serbia.

Years of Nazi occupation (1938/9-1944/5) were marked by renewed restrictions and persecutions. By 1942, Reinhard Heydrich, architect of the Final Solution, had become governor of the Czech Protectorate. After the May 27, 1942 assassination attack on Heydrich's car in Prague, Czech and Slovak partisans took refuge in the crypt of the Ss. Cyril and Methodius Cathedral before continuing their escape. They were aided by senior church laymen, who kept Bishop Gorazd informed. However, their presence was discovered by the Nazis, and on June 18 the Nazis attacked their hiding place in the cathedral, forcing them to commit suicide. The Orthodox priests, laymen, and Bishop Gorazd were arrested and killed by firing squads on September 4, 1942.

In reprisal the Nazis forbade the church to operate in Bohemia and Moravia. Churches and chapels were closed, and a rounding up of Czechs was conducted, including the whole village of Lidice, whose inhabitants were either killed or sent to forced labor camps. For the Orthodox the whole church fell under the Nazi persecution and was decimated. A total of 256 Orthodox priests and laymen were executed, and church life came to a stop.

Post-War developments

In 1945, after the incorporation of Carpatho-Rus' by the USSR as Zakarpattia Oblast of the Ukrainian SSR, eastern parts of the Eparchy of Mukačevo and Prešov were transferred from the supreme jurisdiction of Serbian Orthodox Church to the jurisdiction of the Russian Orthodox Church, and on that territory a new Eparchy of Mukačevo and Užgorod was formed, while the western part of the diocese remained in Czechoslovakia and was reorganized as Eparchy of Prešov.

After World War II, the Orthodox Church in Czechoslovakia began its recovery without its bishop. On December 9, 1951, the Patriarch of Moscow granted autocephaly to the Orthodox Church of Czechoslovakia, recognized by nearly all Orthodox local churches, though this action was not recognized by Constantinople, who made unsubstantiated and uncanonical claims to jurisdiction, regarding the Czechoslovak church as being autonomous under its authority. The Patriarch of Constantinople later issued a Tomos, or official proclamation, of autocephaly in 1998.

When the Communists popularly came to power in April 1950, the government convoked a synod of the Greek Catholic Church at Prešov, at which five priests and a large number of laymen signed a document declaring that the union with Rome was disbanded and asking to be received into the jurisdiction of the Moscow Patriarchate, later the Orthodox Church of Czechoslovakia. The move was made with widespread popular support where the so-called Uniate church and Uniate faithful were presented with the choice of remaining subservient to Rome and becoming Latin rite Catholics or returning to their ancestral Orthodox Faith to undo the injustice that the deceptive creation of the Uniate church constituted. The vast majority of so-called Greek Catholics chose to return to the Orthodox Church of their ancestors. The government then transferred control of the Greek Catholic churches and other property to the Orthodox Church.

During the Prague Spring in 1968, the former Greek Catholic parishes were allowed to restore communion with Rome. As a result of anti-Russian sentiment, of the 292 parishes involved, 205 voted in favor. This was one of the few reforms by Dubček that survived the Soviet invasion the same year. However, most of church buildings remained in the hands of Orthodox Church as they had originally been built as Orthodox churches and/or the congregations of these churches had in large measure voted to have their parishes placed under the omophorion of the Orthodox Church in 1950. After communism was overthrown in the 1989 Velvet Revolution, most of the Church property was returned to the Slovak Greek Catholic Church by 1993.

The martyrdom of Bishop Gorazd was recognized by the Serbian Orthodox Church on May 4, 1961, which canonized Gorazd as a New Martyr. Subsequently, on August 24, 1987, he was canonized at the Cathedral of St. Gorazd in Olomouc, Moravia.

Archbishop Rastislav of Prešov was elected by the Extraordinary Synod held on January 11, 2014, as the new primate. On December 9, 2013, the Synod removed Archbishop Simeon (Jakovlevic) of Brno and Olomouc from his position as Locum Tenens (ad interim administrator following the resignation of the previous primate, Archbishop Krystof, over allegations of sexual relations with women), and appointed Archbishop Rastislav in his place, an action against which Archbishop Simeon protested and which was deplored by Ecumenical Patriarch Bartholomew I of Constantinople, who had supported Krystof.

Administration 
After Czechoslovakia separated into independent countries of the Czech Republic and Slovakia in 1993, church activity continued in each country as separate legal entities: in the Czech Republic as the Orthodox Church in the Czech Lands and in the Slovak Republic as the Orthodox Church in Slovakia, but canonical unity was maintained as the Orthodox Church of the Czech Lands and Slovakia. The church is now organized into four eparchies divided into two administrative centers: the Metropolitan Council for the Czech Republic resident in Prague and the Metropolitan Council for the Slovak Republic in Prešov. Under the Council of the Czech Lands (Prague) are the eparchies of Prague and Olomouc-Brno, while the eparchies of Prešov and Michalovce are under the Council of Slovakia (Prešov).

After the death of Metropolitan Dorotheus of Prague and All Czechoslovakia, Archbishop Nicholas of Prešov was elected the new metropolitan, and the church's primatial see was moved from Prague to Prešov. Metr. Nicholas reposed on January 30, 2006, and was replaced by Archbishop Christopher of Prague and the Czech Lands (elected May 2, 2006).

In the Czech Republic there are 82 parishes, with 51 in Bohemia and 31 in Moravia and Silesia. In Slovakia there are 90 parishes, with 69 in the eparchy of Prešov and 21 in the eparchy of Michalovce. The Orthodox Theological Faculty of the University of Prešov provides an education for future priests of combined Church. The faculty maintains a detached branch in Olomouc.

The Monastery of St. Procopius of Sazava is located in Most, and that of the Dormition in Vilemov.

Archdioceses and archbishops 
 Archdiocese of Prešov and Slovakia : Metropolitan Rastislav (Gont), Metropolitan of the Czech Lands and Slovakia (since 2014)
 Archdiocese of Prague and the Czech Lands: Michal (Dandár) (since 2015)
 Diocese of Brno and Olomouc: Simeon (Jakovlevic) (since 2000)
 Diocese of Michalovce and Košice: Juraj (Stránský) (since 2007)

Vicar dioceses and bishops 
 Diocese of Beroun : Jachým (Hrdý) (since 2015), vicar bishop of Prague
 Diocese of Komárno : Tichon (Hollósy) (since 2006), vicar bishop of Prešov

References

External links 

Official website in the Czech Republic
Official website in Slovakia (in Slovak)
Prague Eparchy of the Orthodox Church in the Czech Lands (in Czech)
Electronic edition of the magazine "Icon"
Pages about the orthodox Church in the Czech Republic (in Czech)
Overview of the Church (scroll down)
Article on the Orthodox Church in the Czech and Slovak Republics by Ronald Roberson on the CNEWA web site

 
Eastern Orthodoxy in the Czech Republic
Eastern Orthodoxy in Slovakia
Eastern Orthodoxy in Europe
Czech Republic–Slovakia relations